This is a list of German television related events from 2004.

Events
13 March - Elli Erl wins the second season of Deutschland sucht den Superstar. Her debut single, "This Is My Life" reaches number three in the Official German Charts in April 2004.
19 March - Max Mutzke is selected to represent Germany at the 2004 Eurovision Song Contest with his song "Can't Wait Until Tonight". He is selected to be the forty-ninth German Eurovision entry during Germany 12 Points! held at the Arena Berlin in Berlin.

Debuts

Domestic
15 January -  (2004) (ARD)
29 February - Dittsche (2004–present) (ARD)
11 October - Stromberg (2004–2012) (ProSieben)
5 November -  (2004) (Arte)

International
2 October -  The O.C. (2003–2007) (ORF 1)

Television shows

1950s
Tagesschau (1952–present)

1960s
 heute (1963-present)

1970s
 heute-journal (1978-present)
 Tagesthemen (1978-present)

1980s
Wetten, dass..? (1981-2014)
Lindenstraße (1985–present)

1990s
Gute Zeiten, schlechte Zeiten (1992–present)
Marienhof (1992–2011)
Unter uns (1994-present)
Verbotene Liebe (1995-2015)
Schloss Einstein (1998–present)
In aller Freundschaft (1998–present)
Wer wird Millionär? (1999-present)

2000s
Big Brother Germany (2000-2011, 2015)
Deutschland sucht den Superstar (2002–present)

Ending this year

Births

Deaths

See also 
2004 in Germany